, or Koun Yamada, was a Japanese Buddhist who was the leader of the Sanbo Kyodan lineage of Zen Buddhism, the Dharma heir of his teacher Yasutani Haku'un Ryoko. Yamada was appointed the leader of the Sanbo Kyodan in 1967, 1970 or 1973 and continued to differentiate the lineage from other Japanese Zen traditions by deemphasizing the separation between laypeople and the ordained—just as his teacher Yasutani had done. Yamada was also instrumental in bringing Christians to the practice of Zen that “by the end of Yamada’s teaching career approximately one quarter of the participants at his sesshins were Christians”.

Biography

Early career
Yamada Koun was born Yamada Kiozo in Nihonmatsu in Fukushima prefecture of Japan in 1907. He attended school with Soen Nakagawa at Dai-Ichi High School located in Tokyo, Japan, and also went to university with him. In 1941 Yamada began working as a labor supervisor for the Manchurian Mining Company—a company known for poor working conditions and exploiting its slave labor forces composed of Chinese peasants, POWs and criminals. By 1945 he had become deputy director of the General Affairs Department for the company.

While working as supervisor for the company his old friend Soen Nakagawa came to the Mining Company's headquarters in Xinjing (modern-day Changchun, Jilin) on behalf of his master, Gempo Yamamoto, in an effort to encourage workers to double their output for Japan's war efforts.

Zen training
According to the foreword in the book The Gateless Gate: The Classic Book of Zen Koans, 

In 1953 Yamada invited Haku'un Yasutani to Kamakura and founded the Kamakura Haku-un-kai. Then, according to Stephen Batchelor, 

Later that night he awoke abruptly from sleep and saw the same passage flash in his mind, which was followed by a kensho experience. The next day Yasutani confirmed that what Yamada had experienced was a kensho.

Sanbo Kyodan succession
Yamada continued to study under Yasutani for seven years following this experience, and in 1961 he became the successor to Haku'un Yasutani—one year after completing some six hundred koans under him. There is some confusion over the date on which Yamada became the leader of the Sanbo Kyodan:
 According to Daizen Victoria in Zen War Stories, "In 1967 Yamada succeeded to the leadership of the Sanbō-Kyōdan (Three Treasures Association), an independent, lay-oriented Zen sect that Yasutani had created in Kamakura in 1953." 
 According to the book The Sound of Liberating Truth, "In 1970 Yamada Kōun became the successor of Yasutani Roshi as head (kanchō) of the Sanbōkyōdan." 
 Finally, according to Michelle Spuler in the book Developments in Australian Buddhism, "Yasutani's successor, Yamada Koun Zenshin (1907-1989), was appointed as the leader of the Sanbo Kyodan in 1973."

The date is most likely 1973, however, as Charles S. Prebish writes in his book Luminous Passage: The Practice and Study of Buddhism in America, 

It is likely the date is not 1967 or 1970 because Yamada would not need anyone's blessing to go to Hawaii were he already the head of the school, not to mention 1973 was the year of Haku'un Yasutani's death.

List of Dharma heirs
Robert Chotan Gyoun Aitken
Niklaus Brantschen
Ruben Keiun-ken Habito
Willigis Jäger
Johannes Kopp
Akira Kubota
Victor Löw
Elaine MacInnes
Gundula Meyer
Ama Samy
Ana Maria Schlüter
Roselyn Stone
Masamichi Ryoun-ken Yamada

Bibliography

See also
Buddhism in Japan
Buddhism in the United States
Timeline of Zen Buddhism in the United States
Hakuun Yasutani Lineage Chart

Notes

References

Sources

 Aitken, Robert (1990). Remembering Yamada Kōun Rōshi, The Eastern Buddhist, New Series 23 (1), 152-154

 Habito, Ruben L. F. (1990). In Memoriam: Yamada Kōun Rōshi (1907-1989, Buddhist-Christian Studies 10, 231-237

External links
Short history page of the Sanbō Kyōdan
Mountain Moon Sangha of Roselyn Stone, Sei'un An Roshi

1907 births
1989 deaths
People from Fukushima Prefecture
Sanbo Kyodan Buddhists
Zen Buddhist clergy
Japanese Zen Buddhists